The International Telecommunication Union (ITU), in its International Radio Regulations, divides the world into three ITU regions for the purposes of managing the global radio spectrum. Each region has its own set of frequency allocations, the main reason for defining the regions.

Boundaries
Region 1 comprises Europe, Africa, the Commonwealth of Independent States, Mongolia, and the Middle East west of the Persian Gulf, including Iraq.
 The western boundary is defined by Line B.
Region 2 covers the Americas including Greenland, and some of the eastern Pacific Islands.
 The eastern boundary is defined by Line B.
Region 3 contains most of non-FSU Asia east of and including Iran, and most of Oceania.

Lines:
 Line B is a line running from the North Pole along meridian 10° West of Greenwich to its intersection with parallel 72° North; thence by great circle arc to the intersection of meridian 50° West and parallel 40° North; thence by great circle arc to the intersection of meridian 20° West and parallel 10° South; thence along meridian 20° West to the South Pole.

Usage
The definition of the European Broadcasting Area uses some of the definitions of Region 1.

ITU Zones
For convenience the regions are further divided into a total of 90 zones.  While often following political boundaries, in more remote land and sea areas these are often defined to be roughly equal in size and so can have very low populations.  As examples, Antarctica is divided into seven zones, and in one Pacific Ocean zone the only land area is tiny Minami Torishima.  For certain awards and contests amateur radio operators may attempt to contact as many zones as possible.

External links
2006 map showing the three ITU regions and the three lines that define the borders (along with an extra line)
Region definitions as specified in Article 5 of the ITU Radio Regulations

References

International Telecommunication Union